Madhagaja is a 2021 Indian Kannada-language action drama film directed by S. Mahesh Kumar and produced by Umapathy Srinivas under the banner of Umapathy Films. The film features Sriimurali, Ashika Ranganath and Jagapathi Babu in the lead roles. The film released in theatres on 3 December 2021.

Plot 
Surya aka Madhagaja is an orphan, who makes a living as a real estate agent in Varanasi. He also earns some quick buck on the dead people that end up in the Manikarnika Ghat. Surya wants to rule the area, but a litigation case lands him and his friend in Shivagaada, a village in Karnataka, which is bloodshed filled-state which is ruled by Bhairava Dorai and Rathnamma, who are the landlords of the village. Surya visits Bhairava Dorai's house and becomes a guest of their village.

Meanwhile, Rathnamma who is suspicious of Surya learns from Basavanna that Surya is her own son, Fearing that Surya would learn of his true origin and would interfere in the bloodshed, Rathnamma gives the amount money to Surya required for the land. After they leave the village, Basavanna reveals to Surya that Bhairava and Rathnamma are his real parents and Rathnamma had left him due to rivalry and bloodshed in the village and entrusted Basavanna to take care of Surya as he should not grow like Bhairava.

Basavanna makes Surya promise to not reveal his identity to them and protect Bhairava's family from all sorts of dangers. Bhairava has a water fued-dispute between Veerabhadra, When he attacks Bhairava and his family at a village festival, Surya interfers in the dispute by thrashing and humiliating Veerabhadra earning Bhairava's trust. Meanwhile, Veerabhadra's son Tandava is released from jail and learns of his father's humiliation. Tandava attacks Surya and Bhairava at the DC's office where Surya evades all attempts by Tandava to destroy Bhairava while Tandava learns of Surya's identity.

Veerabhadra and Tandava decide to end the enmity and send the water to the village by having Tandava and Pallavi (Bhairava's friend's daughter) married, to which they agree. Bhairava and Rathnamma, who learns Pallavi loves Surya ask Surya to leave the village. Actually, the wedding was a plan to prevent the digital clock fixing in the river by Bhairava and the villagers. Tandava, Veerabhadra kidnaps Bhairava and family and Basavanna where he reveals Surya's true origin to Bhairava. Surya arrives in time and rescues them and kills Tandava and Veerabhadra, thus rendering peace and the riverwater is flown in the village, Thus Surya reunites with his family and Pallavi.

Cast 
 Sriimurali as Surya Madhagaja 
 Ashika Ranganath as Pallavi
 Jagapathi Babu as Bhairava Dorai
 Devayani as Rathnamma
 Chikkanna as Suriya's Friend 
 Rangayana Raghu as Basavanna
 Ramachandra Raju as Tandava
 Shivaraj K R Pete as Veeresha
 Dharmanna Kadur as Lawyer
 Anil Kumar as Veerabhadra

Soundtrack

Production 
Principal photography wrapped on 26 August 2021.

Box office
The movie grossed ₹7.82 crores on the first day and had collected ₹20.23 crores within 3 days. It collected ₹25.7 crores on first week. It completed 50 days in 11 centers of Karnataka.

References

External links 
 

Indian action drama films
2020s Kannada-language films
Films scored by Srimurali